The IEEE 802.11 family of standards describe the DCF protocol, which controls access to the physical medium. A station must sense the status of the wireless medium  before transmitting. If it finds that the medium is continuously idle for DCF Interframe Space (DIFS) duration, it is then permitted to transmit a frame. If the channel is found busy during the DIFS interval, the station should defer its transmission.

DIFS duration can be calculated by the following method.

DIFS = SIFS + (2 * Slot time) 

IEEE 802.11g is backward compatible with IEEE 802.11b. When these devices are associated with same AP all the timing parameters are changed to 802.11b.

See also 
  SIFS
  PIFS
  AIFS
  RIFS
  EIFS
  DCF

References 

D
Media access control